The Cabinet of Malta is the collective decision-making body of the Government of Malta, composed of the Prime Minister and a number of ministers who are selected by the Prime Minister from the elected members of the House of Representatives to head government departments. Parliamentary Secretaries (equivalent to junior ministers) can also be invited to attend cabinet meetings as well as other senior government officials. It is presided over by the Prime Minister of Malta.

Current Cabinet
Maltese Government 2022–2027

See also
List of Maltese governments
Maltese Government 2022–2027

References

Government of Malta